"Narcissistic Cannibal" is a song by American nu metal band Korn, released as the second single from their tenth studio album, The Path of Totality. It was co-produced by DJs Skrillex and Kill the Noise. The single was released to active rock and mainstream rock radio stations on October 18, 2011, followed by a digital release on October 24, 2011. It was released to alternative radio stations on November 8, 2011.

The song was made available for free download as a WAV file on Korn's official website from October 13 until October 16.

Composition
Jonathan Davis said about the song:

Music video
The band filmed a music video for the track on September 27, 2011 at the legendary Roxy Theatre in Hollywood. The first 125 fans to show up got in for free to attend the shoot. It was directed and produced by ShadowMachine Films, best known for the Adult Swim television programs, Robot Chicken and Moral Orel. The video was officially released on October 21, 2011.

Track listing
Digital single
"Narcissistic Cannibal"  (album version) – 3:14

Remix EP
"Narcissistic Cannibal (Dirty Freqs Dub)"
"Narcissistic Cannibal (Dirty Freqs Mix Show Remix)"
"Narcissistic Cannibal (Adrian Lux & Blende Remix)"
"Narcissistic Cannibal (Andre Giant Remix)"
"Narcissistic Cannibal (Dave Audé Club Mix)"
"Narcissistic Cannibal (Dave Audé Dub)"
"Narcissistic Cannibal (Dave Audé Radio Mix)"
"Narcissistic Cannibal (J. Rabbit Remix)"

Chart performance
"Narcissistic Cannibal" debuted at number forty-two on Billboard's Rock Songs chart for the issue date of November 5, 2011. It debuted at number thirty-four on Alternative Songs the following week.

Charts

Weekly charts

Year-end charts

References

Korn songs
2011 singles
Song recordings produced by Skrillex
Skrillex songs
Songs written by Reginald Arvizu
Songs written by Jonathan Davis
Songs written by James Shaffer
Songs written by Skrillex
2011 songs
Kill the Noise songs
Industrial metal songs
Dubstep songs